Vincenta da Ponte (fl. second half of the 18th century) was an Italian composer, singer and instrumentalist. She was a member of the coro, or music school, of Venice's Ospedale della Pietà during the tenure of :it:Bonaventura Furlanetto as music director. Her origins are unknown, but her surname indicates that she was a member of a patrician family and not a foundling, as were most of the Ospidale's students; consequently, she would have been a tuition-paying student, or would have been awarded a scholarship.

As a composer, Da Ponte is known only from an unpublished set of four dances included in a collection of monferrine and composed around 1775; the manuscript is held in the Conservatorio di Musica Benedetto Marcello in Venice.

Da Ponte is one of five composers known to have emerged from the coro of the Ospedale; the others include Anna Bon and the foundlings Agata, Michielina, and Santa della Pietà.

References
Berdes, Jane L. "Da Ponte, Vincenta (fl second half of the eighteenth century).  Italian instrumentalist, singer and composer." The Norton/Grove Dictionary of Women Composers. Julie Anne Sadie and Rhian Samuel, eds. New York City; London: W. W. Norton & Company, 1995. p. 137.

18th-century Italian composers
Italian women composers
18th-century births
Year of birth unknown
Year of death unknown